Filbert is former coal town on Sandlick Creek now part of the City of Gary in McDowell County, West Virginia, United States. Its post office  closed in 1991.

Notable person
Daisy Elliott, Michigan legislator and realtor, was born in Filbert.

References

Populated places in McDowell County, West Virginia
Coal towns in West Virginia
Neighborhoods in West Virginia